The 2019 UNAF U-20 Women's Tournament was the 1st edition of the UNAF U-20 Women's Tournament. The tournament took place in Morocco, from 1 to 8 October 2019.

Participants

 (invited)
 (hosts)

 (withdrew)
 (withdrew)

Tournament

Matches

References

External links
 2019 UNAF U-20 Women's Tournament - UNAF official website

2019 in African football
UNAF U-20 women's tournament
UNAF U-20 Women's Tournament